Edithvale railway station is located on the Frankston line in Victoria, Australia. It serves the south-eastern Melbourne suburb of Edithvale, and it opened on 20 September 1919.

History

Opening on 20 September 1919, Edithvale station gets it name from Edithvale Road, itself named after a local farm, Edithvale Farm, which was established in the 1850s and owned by John and Edith Greves.

In its early years, a siding existed on the Down side before Platform 2.

In 1978, boom barriers replaced interlocked gates at the former Edithvale Road level crossing, which was located at the Down end of the station. In 1981, the former ground level station buildings were provided.

On 28 July 2019, the Level Crossing Removal Project announced that the level crossing was fast-tracked to be grade separated by 2022. Construction started in 2020, with the former ground level station closing on 25 July 2021 for demolition. On 22 November of that year, the rebuilt station opened to passengers. As part of the project, the line was lowered into a trench, and the station rebuilt, along with Chelsea and Bonbeach.

Platforms and services

Edithvale has two side platforms. It is serviced by Metro Trains' Frankston line services.

Platform 1:
  all stations and limited express services to Flinders Street, Werribee and Williamstown

Platform 2:
  all stations services to Frankston

Transport links

Kinetic Melbourne operates one SmartBus route via Edithvale station, under contract to Public Transport Victoria:
  : Chelsea station – Westfield Airport West

Ventura Bus Lines operates two routes via Edithvale station, under contract to Public Transport Victoria:
 : Mordialloc – Chelsea station (off-peak only)
 : Edithvale – Aspendale Gardens

Gallery

References

External links

 Melway map at street-directory.com.au

Railway stations in Melbourne
Railway stations in Australia opened in 1919
Railway stations in the City of Kingston (Victoria)